Agyei William Kwabena "Will" Antwi (born 19 October 1982), is an English-born Ghanaian former professional footballer and head coach for England U15s.

As a player, he was a defender who played between 2002 and 2014. He represented the Ghana national football team as well as appearing for Crystal Palace, Ljungskile SK, Aldershot Town, Wycombe Wanderers, Northwich Victoria, Dagenham & Redbridge, Luton Town, Grimsby Town, Staines Town and AFC Wimbledon.

Career

Crystal Palace

Born in Epsom, Surrey, Antwi attended Chace Community School in north London before moving as a trainee to Crystal Palace where he became a professional player. After a brief spell in Sweden with Ljungskile SK, he returned to England with Conference side Aldershot Town where he played a pivotal part in their promotion push, including scoring the winning penalty against Hereford United in the 2003–04 Conference play–off semi–final, losing out on penalties in the final

Wycombe Wanderers
Antwi joined Wycombe Wanderers on a free transfer in the summer of 2005 after leaving Aldershot but a groin injury in pre season meant he made his full debut on 8 April 2006, against Macclesfield Town and went on to keep his place for the 2005–06 League Two play–off games against Cheltenham Town. Antwi was given the number 5 shirt for the 2006–07 season and the 2007–08 season. Antwi captained the side on several occasions early on in the season, and took on the role of vice-captain for the 2007–08 season but found his time there to be devastated by injury.

Antwi went out on loan to Northwich Victoria on 14 November 2008, after returning from a broken toe which he suffered in the League Cup match against Birmingham City on 13 August. He returned to help guide Wycombe to automatic promotion to League One that season.

Dagenham & Redbridge
Antwi left Wycombe on 6 May 2009 and signed for Dagenham and Redbridge on a two-year contract on 17 July. He enjoyed a commanding first half of the season but on 5 December was sidelined with an ankle injury that kept him out for the rest of the season. However Dagenham went on to clinch promotion to League One in the 2009–10 League Two play–off final on 30 May 2010 at Wembley Stadium, the highest position in the club's history. Antwi left Dagenham after their relegation from League One in the 2010–11 season.

Luton Town
On 29 July 2011, he signed a six-month contract with Luton Town in the Conference. On 24 November 2011 he joined Grimsby Town on a one-month loan. Upon his return to Luton he left to take a look at options in the Veikkausliiga following the end of his contract at Kenilworth Road.

Staines Town
On 14 February 2012, Antwi joined Conference South side Staines Town. On 14 March 2012, Antwi went on, an ultimately unsuccessful, trial at Finnish Premier League side Vaasan Palloseura.

AFC Wimbledon

On 14 September 2012, Antwi joined League Two side AFC Wimbledon, teaming up once again with manager Terry Brown whom he had worked with at Aldershot Town. On 31 January 2013, his Wimbledon contract was extended until the end of the 2012–13 season. Antwi then agreed to stay on with AFC Wimbledon for the 2013–14 season.

Antwi was released by the club at the end of the 2013–14 season and went on to join Barnet on trial, he featured in the club's 1-0 friendly defeat against Peterborough United.

Coaching career
In August 2012, Antwi began working as a part-time academy coach at Premier League side Tottenham Hotspur.

On 16 August 2022, Antwi was appointed as the head coach of England U15s.

References

External links

1982 births
Living people
Sportspeople from Epsom
English footballers
English expatriate footballers
Citizens of Ghana through descent
Ghanaian footballers
Ghana international footballers
Ghanaian expatriate footballers
Association football defenders
Crystal Palace F.C. players
Ljungskile SK players
Aldershot Town F.C. players
Wycombe Wanderers F.C. players
Northwich Victoria F.C. players
Dagenham & Redbridge F.C. players
Luton Town F.C. players
Grimsby Town F.C. players
Staines Town F.C. players
AFC Wimbledon players
Tottenham Hotspur F.C. non-playing staff
English Football League players
National League (English football) players
Expatriate footballers in Sweden
English expatriate sportspeople in Sweden
English people of Ghanaian descent
Ghanaian expatriate sportspeople in Sweden
People educated at Chace Community School